The Short North is a neighborhood in Columbus, Ohio, United States, centered on the main strip of High Street immediately north of the Arena District and extending until just south of the University District and Ohio State University. It is an easy walk from the convention center or Nationwide Arena district to the south, Spanning the length of High Street from the north side of Goodale Street to the south side of 7th/King Avenue. It is flanked by Victorian Village to the west and Italian Village to the East. The Short North is a densely-populated commercial and residential district, with especially high pedestrian use during its monthly "Gallery Hop" and other local and downtown events.

The Short North has been described as "colorful", "offbeat", and "trendy". The district is heavily populated with art galleries, specialty shops, pubs, nightclubs, and coffee shops. Most of its tightly packed brick buildings date from at least the early 20th century, with traditional storefronts along High Street (often with brightly painted murals on their side walls), and old apartment buildings and rowhouses and newer condominium developments in the surrounding blocks. The city installed 17 lighted metal arches extending across High Street throughout the Short North, reminiscent of such arches present in the area in the early 1900s.

History

Originally known as part of the "near north side", the area along High Street began to be called the "Short North" as part of vernacular used by police and taxi drivers in the 1980s. This was a period of decline in the area, and from a suburban commuter's perspective, the area had fallen 'just short' of the central business district's north end—both physically and economically. In 1981, the Short North Tavern opened in this area, the first to use this new name.

A reputation for diversity and an artistic, Bohemian atmosphere has marked the Short North, with land prices and local rents rising steadily from the humble beginnings as a squatter’s neighborhood in the 1980s. Prior to this gentrification of the neighborhood which originated from artists, it had suffered prolonged decay and from latent, street-level crime and gang violence as Columbus affluent residents followed the economic bubble outward—into the suburbs—during the 1960s and 1970s.

The 1980s saw the neighborhood's rebirth enter into full gear as galleries began to open up and started to flourish. As Maria Gallowy (owner of PM gallery, formerly the oldest gallery in the Short North) once put it "It was one of those neighborhoods that artists love to move into because the possibilities are there." In 1984 two Short North area galleries — the now defunct Art Reach and PM gallery — began opening new exhibits on the first Saturday of every month to help cross-promote their businesses and build a more unified community. This loose coordination later evolved into the Gallery Hop which is still held every first Saturday of the month. The Gallery Hop today features most businesses keeping their doors open late into the night, jam-packed streets, and sidewalks populated with street musicians and other performers.

Since 1983, the Short North has also hosted the annual Doo Dah Parade, a parody of typical Fourth of July parades that includes politically slanted paraders and floats as well as absurdities such as the "Marching Fidels," a band of Fidel Castro lookalikes. The parade starts in neighboring Victorian Village, at Goodale Park, and winds north to finish coming south down High Street.

The Short North also hosts HighBall Halloween, Masquerade on High, a fashion show and street parade that closes down High Street. In 2011, in its 4th year, HighBall Halloween gained notoriety as it accepted its first Expy award. HighBall Halloween has much to offer for those interested in fashion and the performing and visual arts or for those who want to celebrate Halloween and with food and drinks from all around the city. Each year the event is put on with a different theme and it increases in size and popularity.

Development
The City of Columbus has designated the Short North, along with portions of Italian and Victorian Villages as a "market ready" Community Reinvestment Area, with available 15-year, 100 percent tax abatements if projects include 10 percent affordable housing, with options to buy out of the requirement.

Gallery

See also

Short North Historic District
Fifth Avenue and North High Historic District
Third Avenue and North High Historic District

References

External links

 The Short North Business Association
 Doo Dah Parade
 ComFest

Neighborhoods in Columbus, Ohio
Gay villages in Ohio
Economy of Columbus, Ohio
Arts districts
Historic districts in Columbus, Ohio
Historic districts on the National Register of Historic Places in Ohio
National Register of Historic Places in Columbus, Ohio
High Street (Columbus, Ohio)